The Wexford Martyrs were Matthew Lambert, Robert Meyler, Edward Cheevers, Patrick Cavanagh (Irish: Pádraigh Caomhánach), John O'Lahy, and another martyr whose name is unknown. In 1581, they were found guilty of treason for aiding in the escape of James Eustace, 3rd Viscount Baltinglass; for refusing to take the Oath of Supremacy which declared Elizabeth I of England to be the head of the Church; and for conveying a Jesuit and other Catholic priests and laymen out of Ireland. On 5 July 1581, they were hanged, drawn and quartered in Wexford, Ireland. They were subsequently beatified by Pope John Paul II.

Background
In the Pale the predominant religion was Catholic, and the Catholics saw a growing threat from the Protestant-dominated government, a perception supported by their marked decline in participation within the kingdom's government. English-born Protestants increasingly occupied positions of authority. The people of the Pale resented taxes on their property for the government's military policy against the Gaelic nobility of Ireland and rebellious Hiberno-Normans. Troops were also billeted upon their lands. James Eustace's father, Viscount Roland, had been imprisoned by the Elizabethan administration for his opposition.

During the summer of 1580, James Eustace, Viscount Baltinglass, apparently prompted almost entirely by religious motives, raised an army in County Wicklow, in support of the  Earl of Desmond's separate uprising in Munster. The Viscount's allies included the coalition of Irish clans led by Fiach McHugh O'Byrne. At first the uprising was successful, but Baltinglass did not coordinate his efforts with those of Desmond and could not sustain the conflict. He and his followers were outlawed. Forty-five were hanged in Dublin. James Eustace escaped to Munster, where Desmond was still in revolt. After Desmond was killed he left for Spain.

Escape of Viscount Baltinglass

Pursued by Crown forces after the defeat of the Second Desmond Rebellion, James Eustace and his chaplain, Father Robert Rochford, eventually found refuge with Matthew Lambert, a Wexford baker. Lambert fed them and arranged with five sailor acquaintances for safe passage by ship for them. Lambert was betrayed, along with sailors Patrick Cavanagh, Edward Cheevers, Robert Myler, John O'Lahy, and one other. They were arrested, imprisoned, and tortured, before being executed in Wexford on 5 July 1581.

The authorities heard of the plan beforehand and Matthew was arrested together with his five sailor friends. Thrown into prison, they were questioned about politics and religion. Lambert's reply was: "I am not a learned man. I am unable to debate with you, but I can tell you this, I am a Catholic and I believe whatever our Holy Mother the Catholic Church believes." They were found guilty of treason and hanged, drawn, and quartered in Wexford on 5 July 1581.

See also
 Irish Catholic Martyrs

References

Irish beatified people
Wexford, County Wexford
History of County Wexford
16th-century Roman Catholic martyrs
1581 deaths
Victims of anti-Catholic violence in Ireland
Martyred groups
Year of birth missing
16th-century Irish people
People executed for treason against Ireland
People executed by Ireland by hanging, drawing and quartering
People executed under Elizabeth I as Queen of Ireland
Executed Irish people
Beatifications by Pope John Paul II
24 Irish Catholic Martyrs